Gewayantana Airport  is an airport located in the village of Tiwatobi, Ile Mandiri, East Flores Regency, East Nusa Tenggara. It is about 10 km (6 miles) from the center of town and 15 km (9 miles) to Larantuka city.

Since August 2014, the service was left to an SOE in charge of the management of several airports in eastern Indonesia, namely PT. Angkasa Pura 2 (Persero) and the Government of East Flores Regency.

Airlines and destinations

References

External links
 Gewayantana airport at the DGCA web page

Airports in East Nusa Tenggara